Commissioned minesweepers and danlayers of the Royal New Zealand Navy (RNZN) from its formation on 1 October 1941 to the present. The RNZN was created two years into World War II. For coherence this article covers the war years from the start, and thus includes also the New Zealand minesweepers operating from the beginning of the war.

World War II minesweepers
During World War II the RNZN operated 39 minesweepers and danlayers. This included 20 naval trawlers (13 , three  and four ), five converted trawlers, 10 converted merchant boats, and four danlayers.

Naval trawlers
Naval trawlers were trawlers purpose built to Admiralty specification to operate as minesweepers and/or anti-submarine boats.

Castle class
Thirteen  naval trawlers were commissioned. Apart from James Cosgrove and Wakakura, all were built in New Zealand by government directive, circa 1942. The coal-fired boiler was of the Scotch marine type. The boiler size governed the size of ship that could be manufactured, and as boiler plate of the required size was not available, two completed boilers and some partly completed boilers were supplied from Britain.

In addition two further Castle trawlers, Tawhai  and Waikato, were completed in 1946 but were not commissioned.

Bird class

They had a complement of 33–35 and were armed with one  gun, two Hotchkiss guns in single mounts, twin Lewis guns and 40 depth charges. They were equipped with asdic.

Isles class
They had a complement of 40 and were armed with one 12-pounder gun, three 20 mm Oerlikons in single mounts and depth charges.

Other types

Converted trawlers
These vessels were usually armed with a quick-firing 4-inch (102mm) or 3-inch (76mm) gun on a raised bow platform, some machine guns, and depth charges. Vessels used for minesweeping were also fitted with minesweeping and mine handling equipment.

Converted merchant boats
These ships were usually armed with a quick-firing 4-inch gun, machine guns and autocannon. Vessels used for minesweeping were also equipped with the appropriate equipment.

Danlayers

COMSOPAC

COMSOPAC is an acronym for Commander South Pacific. During World War II, one of the major United States theatre commands was the command of the South Pacific Area. This command was usually referred to as COMSOPAC (COMmander SOuth PACific)

It was formed in April 1942 as a subordinate command of Pacific Ocean Areas, commanded by Robert L. Ghormley through October 1942, William Halsey, Jr. to June 1944, John H. Newton to March 1945, and William L. Calhoun to the end of the war.

In June 1942 New Zealand passed the operational control of most of its South Pacific naval forces to COMSOPAC. This continued until COMSOPAC released control in June 1945.

The headquarters for COMSOPAC were initially located in Auckland, New Zealand. In July 1942 they were transferred to Nouméa, New Caledonia,

The 25th Minesweeping Flotilla
In the early months of World War II the New Zealand minesweepers had no formal grouping as a flotilla Then Niagra was sunk in June 1940. On 18 July 1940 the Naval Board designated the First Group for coastal minesweeping, and allocated Port minesweepers to the main ports. They were:

First Group
 Futurist, Humphrey, James Cosgrove, South Sea, Thomas Currell, Wakakura
 Danlayer: Coastguard

Port Minesweepers
 Dutchess, Muritai, Nora Niven

On 14 November 1940, a few weeks after the founding of the Royal New Zealand Navy, they were reorganised as the
First Minesweeping Flotilla (NZ)

First Group
 Group leader: Matai
 Muritai, Rata, Gale, Puriri
 Danlayer: Coastguard

Port Minesweepers
 First Minesweeping Group: Wakakura, Humphrey, Dutchess – Auckland
 Second Minesweeping Group: South Sea, Futurist – Wellington
 Third Minesweeping Group: James Cosgrove, Thomas Currell – Lyttelton

Then on 23 December 1940 the Port minesweepers were separated, and the remaining minesweepers were organised into the 25th Minesweeping Flotilla. This name aligned with the flotilla names used by the Royal Navy. The makeup of this flotilla changed during the course of the war, as new minesweepers were commissioned, others sunk or withdrawn for repairs or refitting, and requirements changed.

Here is a snapshot of the 25th Minesweeping Flotilla on 27 March 1943:

7th Trawler Group – Auckland
 Four Isles class: Inchkeith, Killegray, Sanda, Scarba
30th Trawler Group
 Kiwi, Tui
 The Loop Guard:
 Danlayers:Nora Niven, Phillis
194th Auxiliary Minesweeping Group – Auckland
 LL magnetic minesweepers: Hinau, Manuka, Rimu, Hawera, Kapuni

94th Auxiliary Minesweeping Group – Auckland
 Matai, Breeze, Gale
95th Auxiliary Minesweeping Group – Wellington
 Futurist, Rata
 Danlayers:  Kaiwaka, Coastguard
96th Auxiliary Minesweeping Group
 James Cosgrove, Thomas Currell

The Port minesweepers were organised into their own flotillas. Eleven new Castle-class minesweepers joined the Port flotillas on completion, 1943–1944.

Post war

Ton class

The RNZN operated two  minesweepers on anti-infiltration patrols in Malaysian coastal waters during 1966 and 1967. 
They are the only commissioned RNZN ships never to have visited NZ.

These Admiralty designed coastal minesweepers were built with composite hulls of wood on aluminium frames and a minimum of magnetic material in the hull. They were intended to meet the threat of seabed mines laid in shallow coastal waters. Their shallow draft gave them some protection against pressure and contact mines, and allowed them to navigate in shallow inshore waters. They were named after British villages which ended with "ton".

Early in 1965 Indonesia was employing a policy of confrontation against Malaysia. New Zealand agreed to assist Malaysia by deploying two Royal Navy minesweepers then in reserve at Singapore. These were commissioned into the RNZN on 10 April 1965 and joined the Royal Navy's 11th Minesweeping Squadron (also Ton class), taking part in anti-infiltration patrols in Malaysian waters.

In their first year they carried out 200 patrols, with 20 incidents involving intruding Indonesians, often taking as prisoners those aboard intercepting small craft. By the time the Indonesian confrontation policy ended in August 1966 Hickleton and Santon had jointly steamed .

See also
 Anti-submarine warfare
 Coastal Forces of the Royal New Zealand Navy
 RNZN Fairmiles in the Solomons

Notes

References
 Breeze, G. E., M.I.Mech.E, A.M.Inst.N.A. Shipbuilding in New Zealand NZIE Proceedings Volume 32, 1946 pp. 155–184 (Shipbuilding during WWII in New Zealand)
 McDougall, R J  (1989) New Zealand Naval Vessels. Page 54–84. Government Printing Office. 
 Waters, Sydney David (1956) The Royal New Zealand Navy, Historical Publications Branch, Wellington:

 Minesweeping in New Zealand Waters
 Anti-Submarine Policy

 Battles for the Solomons
  The Minesweeping Flotillas

Further reading
 Burgess, Michael (1981)The Royal New Zealand Navy: A Pictorial History. Allied Press Ltd.  (many pictures of New Zealand minesweepers)
 Harker, Jack (2000)The Rockies: New Zealand Minesweepers at War. Silver Owl Press. 
 Harker, Jack S (2001) The birth and growth of the Royal New Zealand Navy. Pentland. 
 Harker, Jack S. (2006) Left hand down a bit! : the Wakakura story. Kotuku Media. 
 Johnston, James Ian (2005) Face with Fortitude. Ianswork Publishers. 
 Wright, Gerry (2006) A Kiwi on our Funnel : The story of HMNZ ships Hickleton and Stanton. Zenith Print and Design. 

 
Military history of New Zealand during World War II
Royal New Zealand Navy